Niño Rojo is the fourth studio release by freak folk artist Devendra Banhart and his third release on the label Young God Records. It was released on September 13, 2004.

In 2007, the song "Little Yellow Spider" was used in a commercial for Orange mobile phone services and in 2005 the song "At The Hop" was featured in a commercial for Cathedral City cheese and in Fat Tire Beer's "Follow your Folly" commercial.

In 2006 the album has received a silver certification from Independent Music Companies Association for 30,000+ copies sold in Europe.

Reception

At Metacritic, which assigns a normalised rating out of 100 to reviews from mainstream critics, Niño Rojo received an average score of 82, based on 18 reviews, indicating "universal acclaim".

Track listing

Personnel 
 Devendra Banhart - guitar (acoustic, electric), vocals, producer, artwork
 Doug Anderson - mastering, mixing
 Lynn Bridges - engineer
 Michael Gira - harmonica, vocals, producer
 Thor Harris - percussion
 Julia Kent - cello
 Jason LaFarge - vocals, engineer
 Joe McGinty - piano, keyboards
 Steve Moses - percussion, trombone
 Siobhan - vocals
 David Smith - trumpet
 Lauren Dukoff - flute
Andy Cabic - backing vocals on "At the Hop"

Chart performance

References 

Devendra Banhart albums
2004 albums
Young God Records albums
Albums produced by Michael Gira